Hòa Mỹ may refer to several places in Vietnam, including:

 Hòa Mỹ, Cà Mau, a rural commune of Cái Nước District
 , a rural commune of Phụng Hiệp District

See also
 , a rural commune of Tây Hòa District, Phú Yên Province
 , a rural commune of Tây Hòa District, Phú Yên Province